Come On Now Social is the seventh studio album by the Indigo Girls, released in 1999.

Track listing
"Go" (Amy Ray) – 4:05
"Soon to Be Nothing" (Emily Saliers) – 4:29
"Gone Again" (Ray) – 3:27
"Trouble" (Saliers) – 4:51
"Sister" (Ray) – 4:58
"Peace Tonight" (Saliers) – 4:11
"Ozilline" (Ray) – 4:43
"We Are Together" (Saliers) – 3:25
"Cold Beer and Remote Control" (Saliers) – 4:17
"Compromise" (Ray) – 2:50
"Andy" (Saliers) – 4:01
"Faye Tucker" (Ray) – 12:01
 Includes a brief outtake of "Sister" and the song "Philosophy of Loss" (Saliers) as hidden tracks.

The song "Go" has a spoken passage inspired by Meridel Le Sueur's "I Was Marching".

Notes 

1999 albums
Indigo Girls albums
Epic Records albums
Albums produced by John Reynolds (musician)